The 1992 World Women's Curling Championship (branded as 1992 Canada Safeway World Women's Curling Championship for sponsorship reasons) took place from March 28–April 5, 1992, at the Olympic Eisstadion in Garmisch-Partenkirchen, Germany. It was also the first year a team from Asia qualified for the championship.

Teams

Round-robin standings

Round-robin results

Draw 1

Draw 2

Draw 3

Draw 4

Draw 5

Draw 6

Draw 7

Draw 8

Draw 9

Playoffs

Brackets

Final

References
 

World Women's Curling Championship
Canada Safeway World Women's Curling Championship, 1992
Women's curling competitions in Germany
International curling competitions hosted by Germany
1992 in German women's sport
Sport in Garmisch-Partenkirchen
March 1992 sports events in Europe
April 1992 sports events in Europe
1990s in Bavaria